Albin Theodor "Abbe" Jansson (9 October 1897 – 22 March 1985) was a Swedish ice hockey player who competed in the 1920 Summer Olympics. In 1920 he was a member of the Swedish ice hockey team which finished fourth in the Summer Olympics tournament. He played one match as goaltender.

References

External links
 
profile

1897 births
1985 deaths
Ice hockey players at the 1920 Summer Olympics
Olympic ice hockey players of Sweden
Swedish ice hockey goaltenders